Romania's tourism sector had a direct contribution of EUR 5.21 billion to the Gross Domestic Product (GDP) in 2018, slightly higher than in 2017, placing Romania on the 32nd place in the world, ahead of Slovakia and Bulgaria, but behind Greece and the Czech Republic. The total tourism sector's total contribution to Romania's economy, which also takes into account the investments and spending determined by this sector, was some EUR 15.3 billion in 2018, up by 8.4% compared to 2017.

In the first three months of the year 2018, there were 3.12 millions of foreign tourists. Compared to the same 3 months of the previous year, arrivals increased by 10.9% and overnight stays in accommodation establishments increased by 7.1%.

In the first nine months of the year 2019, there were 10 millions of foreign tourists. Compared to the same 9 months of the previous year, arrivals increased by 10.2%.

According to National Tourism Statistics, 15.7 million domestic and foreign tourists stayed in overnight accommodations in 2018. Of these 2.2 million are recorded as foreign tourists.

The most visited cities are Bucharest, Constanța, Brașov, Timișoara, Sibiu, Alba-Iulia, Cluj-Napoca, Sighișoara and Iași. Natural touristic attractions include the Danube, the Carpathian Mountains, and the Black Sea.

UNESCO World Heritage Sites in Romania 

 Churches of Moldavia – The eight Romanian Orthodox Churches of Moldavia are located in Suceava County, northern Moldavia, (Bukovina) and were built approximately between 1487 and 1583. 
 Dacian Fortresses of the Orăștie Mountains – The six fortresses (Sarmizegetusa Regia, Costești-Cetățuie, Costești-Blidaru, Piatra Roșie, Bănița and Căpâlna) that formed the defensive system of Decebalus were created in the 1st centuries BC and AD as protection against Roman conquest, and played an important role during the Roman-Dacian wars.
 Historic Centre of Sighișoara –  It is an inhabited medieval citadel that was built in the 12th century by Saxon colonists under the Latin name Castrum Sex and it is the birthplace of Vlad III the Impaler also known by the name of Count Dracula.
 Danube Delta – It is the second largest river delta in Europe and best preserved on the continent.
 Monastery of Horezu – It was founded in 1690 by Prince Constantin Brâncoveanu in the town of Horezu, Vâlcea County, Wallachia, Romania and it is considered to be a masterpiece of "Brâncovenesc style", known for its architectural purity and balance, the richness of its sculpted detail, its treatment of religious compositions, its votive portraits, and its painted decorative works.
 Villages with fortified churches in Transylvania – They are seven villages (six Saxon and one Székely) founded by the Transylvanian Saxons. They are dominated by fortified churches and characterized by a specific settlement pattern that has been preserved since the late Middle Ages.
 Wooden Churches of Maramureș – They are high timber constructions with characteristic tall, slim bell towers at the western end of the building. They are a particular vernacular expression of the cultural landscape of this mountainous area of northern Romania. These churches are: Bârsana, Budești, Desești, Ieud, Plopiș, Poienile Izei, Rogoz, Șurdești.
 Primeval Beech Forests of the Carpathians and Other Regions of Europe

Activities

 Swimming at the Black Sea resorts (from North to South): Năvodari, Mamaia, Constanța, Eforie Nord, Eforie Sud, Costinești, Olimp, Neptun, Jupiter, Cap Aurora, Venus, Saturn, Mangalia, 2 Mai and Vama Veche.
 Skiing in the mountain resorts: Sinaia, Bușteni, Semenic, Azuga, Straja, Păltiniș, Rânca, Cavnic, Arieșeni, Predeal and Poiana Brașov.
 Cultural cities of Bucharest, Timișoara, Sibiu, Brașov, Cluj-Napoca, Oradea, Arad, Alba Iulia, Sighișoara, Târgu Mureș, and Iași.
 Rural tourism, which mainly revolves around the folklore and traditions of Banat, Maramureș and Bukovina. Given their more isolated, mountainous character and diversity of the population, the inhabitants of these two northern Romanian regions have kept old traditions such as painting Easter eggs, painting houses and in some parts have even kept the old local architecture alive.
 Hiking in the Carpathian Mountains with many Mountain huts available
 Spas and health resorts: Băile Herculane, Băile Felix, Buziaș, Sovata, Călimănești, Moneasa and Techirghiol
 Museums
 Travel with Mocănița steam-powered locomotive trains in the mountainous areas of Banat, Maramureș, Transylvania, and Bukovina.
Travel the water channels of the Danube Delta, stay in traditional villages that can only be reached by boats such as Sfântu Gheorghe.

Major touristic attractions

 Many medieval castles and fortifications
 Scărișoara Cave and Bears' Cave, both located in Apuseni Mountains
 Sphinx and Babele, both situated in Bucegi Mountains
 Cheile Nerei-Beușnița National Park, Domogled-Valea Cernei National Park, Semenic-Caraș Gorge National Park, Iron Gates in Caraș-Severin County
 Ceahlău Massif, in Neamț County
 Piatra Craiului Mountains
 Berca Mud Volcanoes, in Buzău County
 Merry Cemetery, in Săpânța, Maramureș County
 Palace of the Parliament, Bucharest, one of the largest buildings in the world
 Lipscani street, in the old town of Bucharest, the most important commercial area of the city and of the Principality of Wallachia from the Middle Ages to the early 19th century
 Transfăgărășan road
 Transalpina road
 Turda Gorge (Cheile Turzii)
 Turda Salt Mine
 Praid Salt Mines
 Iron Gates (Danube Gorge)
 Hațeg Island, Hunedoara County
 Sighișoara, a medieval fortified city in southeastern Transylvania (also the birthplace of Vlad Țepeș)
 The old town of Timișoara
 Bigăr Waterfall: according to The World Geography, Bigăr waterfall is a unique waterfall worldwide.
 Cozia National Park, with mountains, ancient ruins, and medieval castles
Danube Delta

Festivals

George Enescu Festival, in Bucharest
EUROPAfest Jazz festival in Bucharest
Gărâna Jazz Festival in Caraș-Severin
Revolution Festival in Timișoara
Peninsula / Félsziget Festival in Târgu Mureș
Golden Stag Festival, in Brașov
Callatis Festival, in Mangalia
Electric Castle Festival, in Bonțida Bánffy Castle near Cluj-Napoca
Transilvania International Film Festival in Cluj-Napoca
Untold Festival, in Cluj-Napoca – Romania's biggest music festival
Neversea Festival, in Constanta
SAGA Festival, in Bucharest
International Theatre Festival in Sibiu
Sighișoara Medieval Festival

Foreign visitors by country
Most visitors arriving to Romania in 2021 were from the following countries:

Facilities for disabled travellers
Facilities for disabled travellers in Romania range from patchy to nonexistent. Anyone with mobility problems should go prepared and ideally have local contacts. 
Although it has made some slow strides towards disabled access since then, and new buildings need to be wheelchair-accessible, implementation has been very poor. In practice Romania remains by and large off-limits to disabled travellers.

Industrial and creative tourism

Industrial tourism, as a niche of tourism in Romania and as a solution to the restructuring and disappearance of former large industrial sites (mining, metallurgy, heavy industry), takes on interest in the country still slowly, despite the country's join to the European Union in 2007. Even if presently the country is confronted with a long and difficult economic transition, it has a rich industrial and scientific history with many of the world's priorities and still has surviving authentic traditional crafts and rural communities. Limited to some geographic areas and not yet on a large scale, by the means of European funds and projects, a sustainable revival of the traditional sector is supported, which also implies creative tourism participatory activities.

Against this big potential, there are relatively few entities, the majority being state owned, that are organizing, providing or permitting public visits, a main cause of this still being the weak implication and support of many public authorities. Meanwhile, the tourism stakeholders pay a relatively weak attention to the hard core of this niche (industrial heritage, technique, science and living industry), and practically there are not many package offers of this kind on the market, with some notable exceptions: ethnographic and wine tourism, also some rehabilitated industrial and forest narrow railways and steam engines still operating.

Primary attractions
According, an industrial and creative tourism attractions web directory for Romania and some neighbouring countries, providing photos and short English descriptions of each objective, the main attractions open to the public are:

 the national and regional technical and ethnographic museums: the Dimitrie Leonida National Technical Museum and the Aviation Museum in Bucharest, the mining museums in Brad, Petrosani, Rosia Montana, a technical museum in Iasi, the tram museum in Timișoara, the Oil Museum in Ploiesti, the astronomic observatories in Bucharest and Bacau, the village museums from Bucharest, Pitesti, Sibiu, Cluj, Timișoara, Valcea, Suceava; 
 the railway tourism on the recently rehabilitated narrow gauges from Brad, Abrud, Covasna, Moldovita, Agnita, Vaser, the Oravita – Anina mountain railway opened in 1864;
 the power plant museums from Cernavoda (nuclear), Iron Gates (hydro, on the Danube, 2200 MW, the biggest in European Union), Sadu (hydro, built in 1896), Sinaia (hydro, built in 1899), Grebla – Resita (hydro, built in 1904);
 factory tours: exception making some food (chocolate, soft drinks, yogurt) factories which provide visits for school children, there are no important companies (car, manufacturing, porcelain, textile, high technology, etc.) to promote such tourist visits. However, some reference enterprises may accept visits at special requests (the Resita Works, metallurgy, heavy machinery, founded in 1771, having a very interesting museum too, The Ruschita Marble Exploitation). A remarkable visit program, started in October 2013, offers the Timisoreana brewery, a factory founded in 1718, with very valuable heritage;
 industrial heritage: even if valuable, a large majority of the monuments are still abandoned by their owners. However, a few exceptions could be mentioned;
 motorsports: despite the missing of an international standard infrastructure like raceways, there are national federations organizing events for many categories and racing schools offering participatory courses;
 the salt mines from: Turda, Praid, Cacica, Slanic Prahova, Ocnele Mari, Ocna Sibiului (salt lakes) are equally famous for their tourism interest (museums, underground entertainment parks) as well as therapeutic exploitation (respiratory diseases)
 traditional crafts: wood carving, weaving, pottery, glass, embroidery. Many craftsmen preserved the traditions in some village areas from Moldavia, Transylvania and Oltenia. The majority are only selling their products on local markets, but they begin to organize and a few open their workshops to the tourists too;
 wineries: some vineyards have incredible landscapes and the wines produced here have a well established and long tradition. Wine tourism provides presentations of the technologies and the storage caves, and is well developed in Romania. Famous big wineries: Murfatlar, Cotnari, Dragasani, Recaș, Prahova Valley, Odobesti, Husi, Cricova (near Chisinau, in the Republic of Moldova, is huge, with about 80 kilometres of tunnels and caves)

Infrastructure
There are 16 international commercial airports in service today. Overall, airports in the country were transited in 2016 by 16.4 million passengers. The largest number of passengers was attracted by Bucharest's Henri Coandă International Airport, which closed the year with a traffic of almost 11 million passengers.

Romania also has a large network of railways, CIA World Factbook lists Romania with the 22nd largest railway network in the world. The railway network is significantly interconnected with other European railway networks.

See also

UNESCO World Heritage Sites in Romania
Castles in Romania
Protected areas of Romania
Transportation in Romania
Aviation in Romania
Seven Natural Wonders of Romania
Seven Manmade Wonders of Romania

References

Further reading
 
 Tourism in the New Europe: The Challenges and Opportunities of EU Enlargement. pp. 256–265.
 
 
 OECD Tourism Trends and Policies 2012. pp. 397–402
 The Report: Romania 2008. pp. 98–100.
 Geography of Travel and Tourism. pp. 286–287.
 Yahoo News article
 The Financial Times article
 International Medical Travel Journal article

External links

 Official Tourism Site of Romania
 Rolandia – Romanian travel agency that blogs about the country's landmarks, history, and culture

 
Economy of Romania
Industrial tourism
Romania